The 2002 Michigan Wolverines football team represented the University of Michigan in the 2002 NCAA Division I-A football season.  The team's head coach was Lloyd Carr.  The Wolverines played their home games at Michigan Stadium.  The team was led by All-Americans Bennie Joppru and Marlin Jackson as well as team MVP B. J. Askew.

Schedule

Game summaries

Washington

Iowa

Source: Box Score

Wisconsin

Source: USA Today
    
    
    
    
    

MICH: Chris Perry 175 Rush Yds (career-high)

Ohio State

Roster

Statistical achievements
Michigan led the Big Ten Conference in quarterback sacks for all games (3.2 sacks per game), while Iowa led for conference games.

John Navarre set numerous single-season school records that he would break the following season: attempts (448), surpassing his own record of 385 the prior season; completions (248), surpassing Tom Brady's 1998 and 1999 totals of 214; yards (2905), Jim Harbaugh's 1986 record of 2729.  He also broke the career pass attempts record (910), surpassing Elvis Grbac's 835 in 1992, which he would extend the following year and which Chad Henne would eventually break in 2007. On September 14, Navarre joined Grbac as the only Wolverines with two career 4-touchdown passing games.  On September 28, he tied Grbac with three such career outings and became the only Wolverine with two in the same season. Navarre broke Tom Brady's single-season yards per game record of 215.5 set in 1999 with a 223.5 average.  He set the current single-season interception percentage record (1.56, minimum 100 attempts), surpassing Wally Gabler's 1965 record of 1.60. He also broke Harbaugh's 1986 single-season 200-yard game total of 8 with 9 and surpassed Brady's career total of 15 by posting his 18th in his junior year.

Awards and honors
Co-captains: Victor Hobson, Bennie Joppru
All-Americans: Bennie Joppru, Marlin Jackson
All-Conference: David Baas, Victor Hobson, Marlin Jackson, Tony Pape
Most Valuable Player: B.J. Askew
Meyer Morton Award: John Navarre
John Maulbetsch Award: Jason Avant
Frederick Matthei Award: David Baas
Arthur Robinsion Scholarship Award: Joe Sgroi
Hugh Rader Jr. Award: Tony Pape
Robert P. Ufer Award: Charles Drake, Bennie Joppru
Roger Zatkoff Award: Victor Hobson

Coaching staff
Head coach: Lloyd Carr
Assistant coaches: Teryl Austin, Erik Campbell, Jim Herrmann, Brady Hoke, Fred Jackson, Scot Loeffler, Terry Malone, Andy Moeller, Bill Sheridan
Trainer: Paul Schmidt
Manager: Craig Hisey (senior manager), Chris Anderson, Tom Burpee, Jeff Clancy, Brandon Greer, Joseph Harper, Michael Henderson, Brad Hoffman, Jeff Levine, Atif Lodhi, Katie McNall, Brad Rosenwasser, Davon Wilson

References

External links
  2002 Football Team -- Bentley Historical Library, University of Michigan Athletics History
 2002 Michigan at NCAA.org

Michigan
Michigan Wolverines football seasons
ReliaQuest Bowl champion seasons
Michigan Wolverines football